Glossodoris buko is a species of sea slug, a dorid nudibranch, a shell-less marine gastropod mollusk in the family Chromodorididae.

Distribution 
The type locality for species is Bilbil Island, Madang Province, Papua New Guinea, . It was also collected at Bohol Island and Luzon Island, Philippines.

Description
Previously confused with Glossodoris pallida this species is distinguished by details of colouring and internal anatomy as well as DNA sequences from other species of very similar appearance.

References

Chromodorididae
Gastropods described in 2018